In geology, a resurgent dome is a dome formed by swelling or rising of a caldera floor due to movement in the magma chamber beneath it.  Unlike a lava dome, a resurgent dome is not formed by the extrusion of highly viscous lava onto the surface, but rather by the uplift and deformation of the surface itself by magma movement underground.  Resurgent domes are typically found near the center of very large open calderas such as Yellowstone Caldera or Valles Caldera, and in turn such calderas are often referred to as "resurgent-type" calderas to distinguish them from the more common (but much smaller) calderas found on shield volcanoes and stratovolcanoes.

The structure that makes a resurgent dome possible is a fracture zone made up of ring faults surrounded by concentric normal faults around the outside of the rings. During initial formation of the caldera these ring faults provide vents for ash-flow eruptions and are the point at which subsidence of the cauldron block occurs. Subsequent magma flows then push the cauldron block back up creating the dome.

In the monitoring of volcanic hazards, resurgent domes are often intensively monitored, as an ongoing increase in elevation accompanied by seismic activity is certain evidence for magma rising beneath the surface.

Examples of calderas with resurgent domes
 Ko'olau Caldera
 Yellowstone Caldera
 Valles Caldera
 Long Valley Caldera
 Lake Toba
 Bennett Lake Volcanic Complex
 Blake River Megacaldera Complex
 Lake Taupo
 Iwo Jima
 La Garita Caldera in Colorado
 Timber Mountain Caldera in Nevada

References

Geologic domes
Volcanology